Chrysostoma is a genus of sea snails, marine gastropod mollusks in the family Trochidae, the top snails.

Description
The solid, thick shell has a globose shape. The spire is very short . The aperture is rounded.  The parietal wall bears a heavy callus which wholly or almost covers the narrow umbilicus.

Species
Species within the genus Chrysostoma include:
 Chrysostoma paradoxum (Born, 1778)
Species brought into synonymy
 Chrysostoma zeus (Fischer, 1874): synonym of Austrocochlea zeus P. Fischer, 1874

References

 MacNeil, F.S., 1960. Tertiary and Quaternary Gastropoda of Okinawa. U.S. Geol. S. Professional Pa., 339:0-0

External links
 To GenBank 
 To ITIS
 To World Register of Marine Species

 
Trochidae
Gastropod genera